Alfia Bilyalovna Nazmutdinova (born 29 April 1949) is a retired rhythmic gymnast who competed for the Soviet Union. She is the 1971 World All-around bronze medalist.

Personal life 
Alfia Nazmutdinova was born to an ethnic Tatar family as one of four daughters.

Career 
Nazmutdinova began training in rhythmic gymnastics in her hometown of Yekaterinburg. She was influenced by her elder sister, Lilia, a rhythmic gymnast and Honored Master of Sports of the USSR. Her coach was Elizaveta Oblygina, one of the first Soviet Honored coaches in rhythmic gymnastics.

Nazmutdinova won the Cup of the USSR three times. Together with teammate Elena Karpuchina, she competed at the 1971 World Championships in Havana, Cuba, winning bronze in the all-around. At the event finals, she won gold medal in ribbon, a silver in ball and a bronze medal in the rope. She was awarded the title of "Master of Sports" in 1965.

After retiring from competition, Nazmutdinova switched to coaching and teaching.

References

External links

History of Soviet World Championships

1949 births
Living people
Russian rhythmic gymnasts
Soviet rhythmic gymnasts
Tatar people of Russia
Sportspeople from Yekaterinburg
Medalists at the Rhythmic Gymnastics World Championships